Resha may refer to:
Resha, Nepal, a village in Baglung district, Nepal
Resha Konkar (born 1987), Indian television actress
Resha (surname)